Horace & Tina is an Australian children's television series that first screened on Network Ten in 2001. The series was produced by Jonathan M. Shiff Productions. The series mixes animatronic characters (Horace & Tina) with live action drama.

Plot
Horace is a short, grumpy, 200-year-old man who is the world's greatest mischief maker. His elder sister, Tina, is a 271-year-old incurable romantic who loves to meddle and give advice. Lauren Parker discovers she is the only person who can see Horace and Tina and has to keep their existence a secret from her family and friends without them thinking she's going crazy.

Cast
 Jasmine Ellis as Lauren Parker
 Jordan White as Max Tate
 Matthew Parkinson as Steve Tate
 Carolyn Bock as Kimberly Tate
 Jackie Kelleher as the voice of Tina
 Frank Gallacher as the voice of Horace
 David Sacher as Lachlan Watson
 Terry Norris as Ern Watson
 Hannah Greenwood as Annabel Delaney
 Carl Lennie as TJ Knox

Episodes

References

External links
 
 

2001 Australian television series debuts
2001 Australian television series endings
APRA Award winners
Australian children's fantasy television series
Network 10 original programming
Christmas television series